Pukar is a 2000 Indian action thriller film co-written and directed by Rajkumar Santoshi and Cinematography by Ashok Mehta, Santosh Sivan, Baba Azmi and Chota K. Naidu. It stars Anil Kapoor, Madhuri Dixit, Namrata Shirodkar, Danny Denzongpa, Shivaji Satam and Om Puri. The score and soundtrack were composed by A. R. Rahman.

Pukar released on 4 February 2000, and received critical acclaim, but did average business at the box office. 

At the 48th National Film Awards, Pukar won 2 National Film Awards – Nargis Dutt Award for Best Feature Film on National Integration and Best Actor (Kapoor). At the 46th Filmfare Awards, Pukar received 2 nominations – Best Actor (Kapoor) and Best Actress (Dixit).

Plot 

Para SF officer Major Jaidev "Jai" Rajvansh and his fellow officer manage to rescue a leading politician as well as capture his kidnapper, Pakistani Terrorist Abhrush. The terrorist has been wanted for years and he is finally captured by the two officers. Jai returns to a joyous welcome and is declared a national hero. His senior offers him to take leave for a week, Jai accepts it and returns to his hometown. There he meets his childhood friend Anjali who has always harboured love for Jai. Anjali wants to make most of Jai's holiday and tries to get close to him and spend time with him as much as she can.

At a party, he meets Miss India, Pooja Mallapa. As they spend time together, they begin to fall in love. As Jai's parents are arranging his marriage to Anjali, Jai admits his love for Pooja and that he always thought of Anjali as a close friend. Heartbroken and jealous, Anjali wants revenge for Jai’s rejection. Realizing her frustration with Jai, Abhrush takes advantage (via the said "kidnapped" politician who is hand in glove with Abhrush) and together they plot to destroy Jai's reputation and life.

Anjali manages to steal confidential documents detailing plans for Abhrush's movement from prison to prison. The following events lead to Jai being court-martialed and declared a traitor to the country. Pooja leaves him due to family pressure. Jai, determined to prove his innocence and redeem himself, decides to pursue Abhrush alone. Ultimately Anjali comes to her senses and realizes her mistake. To atone for it, she single-handedly tries to thwart Abhrush's plans and help Jai prove his innocence. Jai overpowers Abhrush. Finally, Jai expresses his love for Anjali and forgives her and both unite to live happily.

Cast 

 Anil Kapoor as Major Jaidev Rajvansh (Jai) 
 Madhuri Dixit as Anjali
 Sudhir Joshi as Anjali's Father
 Namrata Shirodkar as Pooja Mallapa
 Om Puri as Colonel Iqbal Hussain (Commanding Officer of the Unit)
 Danny Denzongpa as Abhrush (Ruthless Terrorist)
 Kulbhushan Kharbanda as Major General of the Regiment (Colonel Commandant)
 Shivaji Satam as Lieutenant Colonel Rana (2IC of the Unit)
 Farida Jalal as Gayetri Rajvansh
 Rohini Hattangadi as Mrs. Mallapa (Pooja's Mother)
 Girish Karnad as Mr. Rajvansh 
 Govind Namdeo as Mr. Mishra
 Anjan Srivastav as Tiwari (Mishra's Assistant)
 Mukesh Rishi as Bakshi (Abhrush's Assistant)
 Yashpal Sharma as Major Kartar Singh 
 K.D Chandran as General Mallapa (Pooja's Father)
 Major Ravi
 Viju Khote as Dayanand Awasthi
 Neeraj Vora
 Prabhu Deva as himself in song, "Kay Sera Sera"
 Lata Mangeshkar as herself in song, "Ek Tu Hi Bharosa"

Soundtrack 

The music is given by A. R. Rahman, while the lyrics were written by Majrooh and Javed Akhtar. The song Kay Sera Sera is based on "Kadhal Niagara" from En Swasa Kaatre. Rahman reused the song "Oh Bosnia" as "Ek Tu Hi Bharosa". The song was composed and performed by Rahman in his Malaysian concert in 1996 that was in aid of Bosnian victims. The piano was played by Rahman himself. "Hai Jaana" has two parts within the film version and soundtrack version. The song "Sunta Hai Mera Khuda" was shot at Arches National Park in Utah, United States. The song " Kismat Se Tum Humko Mile Ho" was shot at Mount Marcus Baker in Alaska, United States.

Track list

Awards

References

External links 
 

2000 films
2000 action drama films
Indian action drama films
Films directed by Rajkumar Santoshi
Films featuring a Best Actor National Award-winning performance
2000s Hindi-language films
Films scored by A. R. Rahman
Indian Army in films
Films about terrorism in India
Films shot in Utah
Films shot in Alaska
Best Film on National Integration National Film Award winners
Films shot in Jammu and Kashmir